Alain Koudou (born 21 October 1984), commonly known as Arunina, is an Ivorian former professional footballer who played as a striker.

Career
Koudou began his career in the Académie de Sol Beni was 2004 promoted to ASEC Mimosas where he scored 17 goals in 13 games. In January 2005 he moved to Belgium-based club KSK Beveren where he played for three years. After a one-year stint with R.O.C. de Charleroi-Marchienne he joined  C.S. Visé on 1 September 2008.

References

External links
 
 Footgoal Profile

1984 births
Living people
Footballers from Abidjan
Association football forwards
Ivorian footballers
Belgian Pro League players
Challenger Pro League players
Championnat National 2 players
Championnat National 3 players
K.S.K. Beveren players
R. Olympic Charleroi Châtelet Farciennes players
ASEC Mimosas players
Red Star F.C. players
C.S. Visé players
USJA Carquefou players
SO Romorantin players
Ivorian expatriate footballers
Expatriate footballers in Belgium
Expatriate footballers in France